Carlos Cruz Mendoza (born 19 January 1960) is a Mexican politician from the Institutional Revolutionary Party. From 2009 to 2012, he was a deputy in the LXI Legislature of the Mexican Congress representing Colima. He also served as municipal president of Armería from 1995 to 1997 and as a local deputy in the LIV Legislature of the Congress of Colima.

References

1960 births
Living people
Politicians from Colima
National Autonomous University of Mexico alumni
Institutional Revolutionary Party politicians
21st-century Mexican politicians
Deputies of the LXI Legislature of Mexico
Members of the Chamber of Deputies (Mexico) for Colima
20th-century Mexican politicians
Municipal presidents in Colima
Members of the Congress of Colima
University of Colima alumni